Gabbiano was the name of at least two ships of the Italian Navy and may refer to:

 , a torpedo boat launched in 1907 and discarded in 1921.
 , a  launched in 1942 and decommissioned in 1971.

Italian Navy ship names